Karamaly (Qaramalı) is a rural locality (a selo) in Akberdinsky Selsoviet, Iglinsky District, Bashkortostan, Russia. The population was 381 as of 2010. There are 18 streets.

Geography 
Karamaly is located 51 km southwest of Iglino (the district's administrative centre) by road. Shipovo is the nearest rural locality.

References 

Rural localities in Iglinsky District